, also known as , was a Japanese  manga magazine published by Hakusensha from 1977 to 2018.

History
After 41 years, it ceased publication with the release of its July 2018 issue on May 26, 2018.

The publishing schedule for  changed regularly since its inception:

Serializations
The following is a partial list of titles serialized in the magazine:
  by Miku Sakamoto
 Blank Slate by Aya Kanno
 Blood Hound by Kaori Yuki
  by Saki Hiwatari
  by Saki Hiwatari
 Camelot Garden (one-shot) by Kaori Yuki
 Glass Mask by Suzue Miuchi
 Grand Guignol Orchestra by Kaori Yuki
 Gunjō Cinema by Ritsu Miyako
 King of Cards by Makoto Tateno
 Ludwig Kakumei by Kaori Yuki
 Ludwig Gensōkyoku: Kaguya-hime by Kaori Yuki
 Orange Chocolate by Nanpei Yamada
 Otomen by Aya Kanno
 Patalliro! by Mineo Maya
 Rasetsu by Chika Shiomi
  by Nanpei Yamada
 Skyblue Shore by Nanpei Yamada
  by Ritsu Miyako
  by Fuyu Tsuyama (story), Rei Izawa (art)
 Tōran Merry Rose by Ritsu Miyako
 Touring Express Euro by Masumi Kawasou
 The Vampire & His Pleasant Companions by Marimo Ragawa
 Yukarism by Chika Shiomi

References

Related magazines
 Hana to Yume
 LaLa
 LaLa DX
 Melody
 The Hana to Yume

External links
  (defunct; link via the Wayback Machine) 

1977 establishments in Japan
2018 disestablishments in Japan
Bi-monthly manga magazines published in Japan
Defunct magazines published in Japan
Hakusensha magazines
Magazines established in 1977
Magazines disestablished in 2018
Magazines published in Tokyo
Monthly manga magazines published in Japan
Quarterly manga magazines published in Japan
Shōjo manga magazines